The East African montane forests is a montane tropical moist forest ecoregion of eastern Africa. The ecoregion comprises several separate areas above 2000 meters in the mountains of South Sudan, Uganda, Kenya, and Tanzania.

Geography
The montane forests extend down to approximately 1000 meters elevation, and as high as 3500 meters. The northernmost enclave is on Mount Kinyeti in the Imatong Mountains of South Sudan, extending south through Mount Moroto in eastern Uganda and Mount Elgon on the Kenya-Uganda border. In Kenya and Tanzania, the ecoregion follows the mountains east and west of the Eastern Rift and associated volcanoes, including the Aberdare Range, Mount Kenya, Mount Kulal, Mount Nyiru, Bukkol, and the Nguruman Escarpment in Kenya, and Mount Kilimanjaro, Mount Meru, Ngorongoro, and the Marang forests (Mbulu Highlands and Mount Hanang) in northern Tanzania.

Climate
The climate of the ecoregion is more temperate and seasonal than the surrounding lowlands. Temperatures can fall below 10° C in the coldest months (July and August) and rise above 30° C in the warm season. Temperatures are generally lower at higher elevations, and frosts can occur at the highest elevations. 

Average annual rainfall varies between 1,200 and 2,000 mm, with two wet seasons – October to December and March to June – and two dry seasons – January and February and July to October. The climate is more humid than the surrounding lowlands, and with less distinct wet and dry seasons. Rainfall varies from mountain to mountain, with elevation, and with the direction of prevailing winds.

Flora
The ecoregion consists of montane forests, grasslands, and savannas, transitioning to the East African montane moorlands on the highest peaks. The ecoregion is home to the Afromontane flora, which occurs in the mountains of eastern Africa, and is distinct from the lowland flora. Some trees in the forests are; the African teak, Utile, Bilinga and Sapele.

Fauna
There are eight endemic or restricted-range bird species in the ecoregion. The Aberdare cisticola (Cisticola aberdare), Abbott's starling (Cinnyricinclus femoralis), and Kenrick's starling (Poeoptera kenricki) occur on only two or three mountains or mountain ranges in the region. The Hunter's cisticola (Cisticola hunteri), Jackson's francolin (Francolinus jacksoni), and Sharpe's longclaw (Macronyx sharpei) range over most of the mountains in the ecoregion.

Endemic mammals include the shrews Crocidura gracilipes, Crocidura raineyi, Crocidura ultima, Surdisorex norae, and Surdisorex polulus, and the rodents Grammomys gigas, Tachyoryctes annectens, and Tachyoryctes audax. 

Limited-range mammals native to the montane forests include Jackson's mongoose (Bdeogale jacksoni), Abbott's duiker (Cephalophus spadix), Zanj sun squirrel (Heliosciurus undulatus), and eastern tree hyrax (Dendrohyrax validus).

There are nine endemic species of reptiles in the ecoregion, including six species of chameleons, most limited to a single mountain or range, and the montane viper (Vipera hindii).

Protected areas
35% of the ecoregion is in protected areas. Protected areas include Aberdare National Park, Mount Kenya National Park, Mount Elgon National Park, Kilimanjaro National Park, Arusha National Park, Kidepo Valley National Park, Kidepo Game Reserve, Pian Upe Wildlife Reserve, Ngorongoro Conservation Area, and Lake Bogoria National Reserve.

Gallery

External links

 
 East African montane forests (DOPA)

References

 
Afromontane ecoregions
Afromontane forests
Afrotropical ecoregions
African Great Lakes
Ecoregions of Kenya
Ecoregions of South Sudan
Ecoregions of Tanzania
Ecoregions of Uganda
Tropical and subtropical moist broadleaf forests